Daniel Zeaiter (born 30 March 1995) is a professional footballer who plays as a goalkeeper for German club FC Eddersheim. Born in Germany, Zeaiter is of Lebanese descent and holds dual-citizenship.

Club career
After signing with MSV Duisburg in 2016, it was announced on 9 May 2018 that Zeaiter would leave Duisburg at the end of the 2017–18 season. He joined Alemannia Aachen for the 2018–19 season, signing a contract until 2020.

On 12 July 2020, Zeaiter joined FC Eddersheim in the Hessenliga, the fifth tier of German football.

International career
Zeaiter was born in Germany and is of Lebanese descent. He was first called up to the Lebanon national football team in 2015.

References

External links
 
 
 Daniel Zeaiter at FuPa.net

Living people
1995 births
Footballers from Hesse
People from Bad Homburg vor der Höhe
Sportspeople from Darmstadt (region)
German footballers
Lebanese footballers
German people of Lebanese descent
Association football goalkeepers
1. FSV Mainz 05 II players
MSV Duisburg players
Alemannia Aachen players
3. Liga players
2. Bundesliga players
Regionalliga players
Hessenliga players
Sportspeople of Lebanese descent